Jorge Gabriel Álvez Fernández (born 26 December 1974 in Montevideo) is a former Uruguayan footballer.

Club career
Alvez has spent most of his career in Uruguay, Argentina and Mexico, notably playing for Defensor Sporting, Nacional and Bella Vista as well as Independiente in the Primera División de Argentina and Pachuca and Morelia in the Primera División de México.

International career
From 1999 to 2000, Alvez made eight appearances for the senior Uruguay national football team.

Honours

National Team
 
 1999 Copa América: 2nd place
Olympiacos
 Alpha Ethniki : 2000–01, 2001–02
Pachuca
 Mexico Primera División : Apertura 2003

References

External links
 
 
 

1974 births
Living people
Uruguayan footballers
Uruguayan expatriate footballers
Uruguay under-20 international footballers
Uruguay international footballers
1999 Copa América players
Defensor Sporting players
Club Nacional de Football players
C.A. Bella Vista players
Centro Atlético Fénix players
Central Español players
Club Atlético Independiente footballers
Olympiacos F.C. players
C.F. Pachuca players
Atlético Morelia players
Atlético Junior footballers
Uruguayan Primera División players
Argentine Primera División players
Liga MX players
Super League Greece players
Footballers from Montevideo
Expatriate footballers in Argentina
Expatriate footballers in Mexico
Expatriate footballers in Greece
Association football forwards